California's 22nd district may refer to:

 California's 22nd congressional district
 California's 22nd State Assembly district
 California's 22nd State Senate district